Andrewesia is a genus of beetles in the family Carabidae, containing the following species:

 Andrewesia apicalis (Chaudoir, 1872)
 Andrewesia obesa (Andrewes, 1923)

References

Lebiinae